Lake Sélingué is a 409 km2 artificial lake in Mali's Sikasso Region,  formed by the Sélingué Hydroelectric dam on the Sankarani River. Its southwestern arm forms part of the border with Guinea. Lake Sélingué, rising and falling in the rainy and dry seasons, allows agriculture on the irrigated perimeters, managed by the Office of Rural Development of Sélingué, as well as fishing. Since its creation, numerous communities have grown along the lake, the two largest being the towns of La Carrière and Faraba. Fishing the lake provides employment for more than 8,000 people in its various fishing communities, with an  annual catch of around 4,000 tonnes. Most fish available in Bamako come from Lake Sélingué.  

Sélingué is Mali's second largest artificial lake (reservoir) after Lake Manantali, created by the construction of the Manantali dam in 1988.

References

Portions of this article were translated from the French language Wikipedia article :fr:Lac de Sélingué, 2008-03-06.
FAO report on Selingue dam
 
Mali : pêcheries de Sélingué - La concertation, source de paix sociale, par Bréhima Touré.
UNH-GRDC Composite Runoff Fields Data V1.0,  1964–1990.  Inflow to Lake Sélingué from the Sankarani River.
P. Morand, IRD, SFLP consultant and C. Breuil, RSU Planning Officer, SFLP, Fisheries in Sélingué: towards a participatory management which is better integrated into local development.  Sustainable Fisheries Livelihood Program: Number 8.
Arfi, R. Ecological changes and water level variation in Sélingué Reservoir (Mali). EGS - AGU - EUG Joint Assembly, Abstracts from the meeting held in Nice, France, 6–11 April 2003, abstract #1768.

Selingue
Guinea–Mali border
Selingue
Bodies of water of Guinea